Class 159 may refer to:

British Rail Class 159
Caledonian Railway 0-4-4T#William Pickersgill